Portrait d'un Robot is a composition by Montenegrin musician Janko Nilovic that includes synthesized and orchestral music, released in 1973. Instrumentation includes piccolo trumpet, trombone, piano, ratchet, Acme Siren, glockenspiel, bass and drums while sound effects consist of doors creaking and alarm clock or telephone sounds.

The piece was used in a film short on the children's program Sesame Street that featured footage of wind-up toys, robots, satellites, and the Space Shuttle in flight.
The piece was also used for the Rocket Clock on the Australian Children's Programme Play School from 1976 to 2000.

References

1973 compositions